"Hasta el Techo" is a Hip hop song by Colombian group ChocQuibTown. It was released as the second single from their third studio album Eso Es Lo Que Hay (2011).

Background and composition
Following the success with their song "De Donde Vengo Yo" in the Latin Grammys they signed with Sony Music Colombia to support their next album Eso Es Lo Que Hay. "Hasta el Techo was released as the second single from the album. The song has described like a "very beautiful experiment" where played the intention to looking for some down-tempo according to Tostao in a promotional video.
The song was written by Gloría Martinez (Goyo), Carlos Valencia (Tostao), Miguel Martinez (Slow) and Andrés Castro, and produced by Andrés Castro and Slow.

Track listing
Album version
 "Hasta el Techo" -

Charts

References

ChocQuibTown songs
2012 singles
Spanish-language songs
2012 songs